Enforcement with consequences is the policy implemented within the US to help deter the rising tide of immigration that has grown in the US.  It is the expansion of policy and consequences for people who choose to enter illegally and subjects them to legal, political and educational debates concerning legality status.

Policy 
In 1965 Congress passed amendments to the Immigration and Nationality Act that placed numerical limits on immigration from the western hemisphere. This also ended longstanding guest worker agreements with Mexico.

By 1976 only 20,000 legal resident visas were allocated per year to Mexico and no temporary work visas were allocated.

By 1985 Ronald Reagan declared illegal immigration a threat to national security.

Beginning in the 1990s, regular crossing points in Texas and California were targeted for extra guarding, such as in 1994 Operation Gatekeeper, as a way to stop crossings in heavy traffic areas. This had little effect on the flow of people across the border and instead pushed people to attempt to cross in more dangerous and secluded areas such as the Sonoran Desert which claims the lives of hundreds of immigrants per year.

In 1996 Congress passed three acts aimed at illegal residents and border protection. They reduced access to safety net programs, toughened border enforcement, made it harder to claim asylum, stripped many due process rights of those in custody and expanded grounds for deportation.

Historical context

Bush administration 
The Bush administration was historically the first to begin with Enforcement with Consequence policies that are used today.  Before 2005 when the policy was beginning to be implemented, border patrol had been using a technique labeled "Catch and Release" which allowed for illegal immigrants who had been apprehended to immediately try to reenter.  The Bush Administration originally had the plan to make a long lasting relationship with Mexico in order to streamline the process of bringing in cheap manual labor to be used in the country.  During 2005 this stance had radically changed however and the beginning of using the US law as consequence for illegal entry had begum.  The house bill written and proposed by James Sensenbrenner began to crack down harder and gave more offenses to aiding illegal immigrants, this included helping or and illegal, knowingly hiring an illegal and being in the country illegally.  The bill was passed on December 16, 2005 and made many of these offenses punishable with Jail time.  This bill created an outcry by pro immigration however and led to many demonstrations and rallies condemning the bill.  This prompted many Democratic senators to begin working on a "grand bargain" which created a more balanced approach to immigration while not excluding Republican ideas outright.  Immigration based on Merit (Education, Experiences and land needs), rather than family reunification was discussed.  During this time Congressman Tom Tancredo (Republican-Colorado) began to voice his opinion that immigration had begun to change the way that American culture was valued.  In the end the Bush administration failed in its original plan to build a relationship with Mexico and was the start of hard consequences for illegal immigration in the country.

Obama administration 
The Obama administration had campaigned with a promise to address and reform the immigration System but after entering into office this idea fell to the wayside in favor of other issues plaguing American Society.  In June 2012 he created the important program to help those who had entered illegally called The Deferred Action for Childhood Arrivals or the DACA program for short, it focused on children who entered illegally against their wills and faced many hardships as a result.  DACA provided protection from deportation and allowed for work authorization to young adults.  It has proven to be overall successful and helped hundreds of thousands to thrive in the US, it is unfortunately constantly under threat however because of bi-partisan legislation and as a result remains under attack.  The Administration is also known to have the highest deportation records of any administration and is responsible for the incarceration of millions of illegal migrants.  The administration wanted to focus more on Illegal immigrants that had were a threat to society and had records.  Large scale work-site raids used by the Bush Administration was done away with and a focus on investigations and penalization of employers was used instead.  As a result of this stance The Fugitive Operations Act had also undergone changes so that the limited resources that were allocated to this process focused on the most dangerous fugitives and not the easiest ones.  Also during this time there was a huge influx of Central American refugees who arrived at the border seeking asylum and protection and as a result the Obama Administration treated it more as an enforcement problem rather than a humanitarian problem faced by the refugees,  As a result poorly constructed detention centers were created to house and deter anymore refugees from coming to the border.  Most were not given fair trails or access to attorneys and the entire system was rushed creating a large number of deported individuals sent back to some of the most unstable areas in the world.

Trump administration 
The Trump Administration has followed the idea of economic nationalism and as such has created an idea of America First with an emphasis on protection American workers and Industries.  The policies put in place have made it extremely difficult to enter the US as an immigrant or refugee.  Bans on many areas have been into place in order to restrict the amount of refugees and asylum seekers, increasing screening of refugees while cutting staff and resources to do so and work to end the DACA program were enacted in order to get a hold on refugee and migrant movement.  Many of the same policies and actions used by the Obama Administration are still used such as detention centers and little to no support in the legal arena for these migrants.  The focus on building the wall has also created a spotlight on the Mexican border making it even harder for illegal migrants to enter the country.  Trump as also closed the border in 2018 hoping to deter people from trying to enter, but the number of asylum seeking refugees has only increased.

Criticism 
To reduce recidivism, Customs and Border Patrol (CBP), the Department of Justice (DOJ), and Immigration and Customs Enforcement (ICE) introduced the Consequence Delivery System (CDS) a joint initiative in December 2005. CDS enforces immigration law with criminal consequences on apprehended aliens to effectively and efficiently deter extralegal border crossings. During the Bush administration, CBP issued “Voluntary Return” for apprehended aliens which induced higher secondary apprehensions of 31%,  a practice known as “Catch and Release”. The concern for the public is the cost of enforcing and applying consequences to prevent the further movement across the U.S. border. An analysis of the rate of recidivism during the period in which CDS was implemented in the southwest border sectors show the lack of consistent consequences. Such factors contribute to the notion that CDS does not impact recidivism, but rather supports a much larger strategy to prevent and deter illegal immigration.  

Strategically, CDS enforces consequences using the whole-of-government approach, coordination and collaboration between all levels of law enforcement. Federal prosecution, state involvement, and local law enforcement contribute to the punitive actions taken on apprehended aliens. The collaborative approach to apply consequences is effective in using the state’s available resources, but inefficiently increases costs compared to other border security measures.  Most notably the Secured Border Initiative (SBI) uses prevention through deterrence by largely relying on the rugged and desolate terrain of the U.S. southwest border to impede the flow of people from the south. Comparatively, CDS uses law enforcement to apply consequence. This measure is taken to deter extralegal crossings with the threat of criminal prosecution. CDS approaches deterrence by diverting resources from federal, state, and local operations to prosecute aliens and enforce consequences. So, in using the natural environment of the U.S. southern border to enhance tactical advantage, SBI compared to CDS is a success in terms of cost. Rather than enhancing available strategies, CDS introduces new coordination in assessing apprehended aliens and strategically applying the Most Effective and Efficient consequences likely to reduce recidivism.  

All southwest border sectors instate the classification of aliens outlined by CDS. Criminal classification is issued when apprehended aliens are suspected smugglers, targeted smugglers, or criminal aliens. Family units, along with 1st, 2nd, and 3rd apprehensions are considered non-criminal, with greater precautions taken on persistently apprehended aliens. Alien classification provides the decision guideline for the Most Effective and Efficient consequence to apply. Effective and Efficient consequences are ordered in increasing severity in the table below.

It is important to note the variation of severity from each consequence. The circumstances of the apprehended alien project the severity of the consequence. For example, human smugglers commit transnational crimes by violating human rights, posing a high threat to national security. Such level of concern constitutes applying the harshest possible consequence under the law. As noted in Table 1, CDS proposes code OA, or Operation Against Smugglers Initiative on Safety and Security (OASISS), as the Most Effective and Efficient consequence applicable for suspected smugglers. In contrast, family unit apprehension constitutes a less serious threat to national security, and CDS concurs by issuing a Warrant or Notice to Appear (WN) as the Most Effective and Efficient consequence. This variation of severity in consequences dependent on the circumstance revolving the apprehension of the alien is a fair determinant. All nine of the border sectors enforce these criminal consequences set by CDS. For each sector of the southwest border, Alien types are ascribed the Most Efficient and Effective consequence. Variations of Most Effective and Efficient consequences for alien type and border sector during the period of FY 13 through FY 15 are formatted in the table below.  

Although all 9 U.S. southwest border sectors enforce CDS, Border Patrol Agents are given discretion in deciding the actual consequence aliens receive. This contributes to variations in actual applied consequences. CDS, for example, in FY 13 established the Most Effective and Efficient consequences as Expedited Removal to a family unit apprehended in the Big Bend sector. In deciding the consequence to apply, Border Patrol agents are allowed to circumvent actual applied consequence that either increase or decrease in severity. This freedom of decision making given to personnel and Border Patrol agents contribute to variables, or inconsistencies in applied consequences. Border Patrol agents consider available resources the within their border sector in deciding what consequence to apply. This contributes to inconsistent enforcement of particular consequences while achieving a reduced recidivism rate.

Data reflecting the resources available for each border sector are not published by DHS, so the overall performance of CBP is used to infer the effectiveness of a consequence. Streamline Prosecution, code SP under CDS, exhaust resources within CBP, DOJ, and ICE to persecute and expedite apprehended aliens. In 2015, the Office of Inspector General reported that Laredo and Del Rio were not given additional resources to execute SP operations. In FY 2014, CBP annual Performance and Accountability Reports reported a 12.5% decrease in recidivism from FY 2013 and remained stagnant through FY 2015 CDS reflects the constraints in resource by avoiding the enforcement of SP as the Most Effective and Efficient in both sectors from FY2014 through FY2015. Although the Most Effective and Efficient consequence was not applied during FY13 through FY15, CBP reported a drop in recidivism. The Most Effective and Efficient consequences are not applied consistently but CDS continues to contribute enforcement with consequence as the main agent reducing recidivism. Rather, CDS contributes and supports the law enforcement complex at the border to prevent and deter extralegal crossings.  

The decrease in recidivism cannot be attributed solely to the implementation of CDS as a deterrent. CBP resources are to impeded a migrant’s illegal border crossing, or to prevent illegal immigration. High recidivism reflected in “Catch and Release” is the downside of enforcement dedicated only to prevention. Enforcement with consequence, the joint initiative of CBP, DOJ and ICE, enforces interior laws to prosecute and remove illegal migrants. Consequences applied under CDS is a humane and legal tool used to deter extralegal border crossings. Under SBI and CDS, contributions of DOJ and ICE reinforce CBP security at the southwest border. This network of law enforcement apprehends and removes illegal and criminal aliens to prevent and deter illegal immigration across the U.S. borders.

Consequences 

Many controversies, repercussion, and dangers surrounds this practice of aggressive enforcement. The change in the policy has jeopardized basic human rights; undocumented citizens are getting mistreated, discriminated, criminalized, arrested, deported, and separated. The process has allowed the U.S. government to police and control undocumented people that are detained. ICE is targeting Latin communities, and mental health has worsened for these communities. The United States is profiting and benefiting from mobilizing the use of private prisons and detention centers are overflowing. One of the publicly known controversy in the recent years is the Zero tolerance policy under The Trump Administration. As the enforcement continues to be carried out, more people are becoming victims from this turmoil.

Support 
Trump admin calls for local police and law enforcement to join with federal immigration enforcement to create a large crackdown on removing undocumented immigrants. The intended goal is to create a relationship between law enforcement and communities so that citizens are willing to help immigration authorities and come forward with suspected undocumented status of those in the community.

The US Immigration and Customs enforcement describes this program to be a way to remove threats to safety and security by working with the FBI and Department of Homeland security to utilize arrest records and fingerprint records and checking them against immigration fingerprint records. This is intended to find those illegal immigrants with a criminal record or outstanding arrest warrant, but also those who are in the United States illegally. The intention is not to create new laws or policies against illegal immigrants, only to more strictly enforce current law.

Attrition through enforcement is an idea that allows the identification and removal of illegal immigrants without the intervention of immigration enforcement. This program requires compliance from local agencies to be strict about making sure social security numbers are attained and used appropriately, visas are in status, and that it is difficult for illegal immigrants to hide their illegal status.

References 

United States federal policy
Law enforcement
Immigration to the United States